James H. Dickinson is a United States Army general currently serving as the commander of the United States Space Command, previously serving as its deputy commander until assuming his current position in August 2020. He also served as the commanding general of the United States Army Space and Missile Defense Command.

Dickinson received his commission as a second lieutenant, through the Army Reserve Officers' Training Corps from Colorado State University in 1985.

Awards and decorations

References

External links
 

 
 

 
 

 

 

 

Living people
1960s births
United States Army personnel of the Gulf War
Colorado School of Mines alumni
Colorado State University alumni
Lieutenant generals
Recipients of the Defense Distinguished Service Medal
Recipients of the Defense Superior Service Medal
Recipients of the Distinguished Service Medal (US Army)
Recipients of the Legion of Merit
United States Army generals
United States Army War College alumni